Gustav von Struensee (13 December 1803, Greifenberg in Pommern – 29 September 1875. Breslau) was a German writer.

1803 births
1875 deaths

People from Gryfice
People from the Province of Pomerania
German male writers